The following is a list of squadrons of the South African Air Force.  The list includes both current and past squadrons of the South African Air Force.

Current squadrons

Disbanded squadrons

See also
South African Air Force
List of bases of the South African Air Force
List of aircraft of the South African Air Force

South African Air Force squadrons

Squadrons of the South African Air Force